Barry John MacKinnon  (born 29 October 1944) is a former Australian politician who was a Liberal Party member of the Legislative Assembly of Western Australia from 1977 to 1993. He was the state leader of the Liberal Party (and thus Leader of the Opposition) from 1986 to 1992, although he led the party at only one election (in 1989). MacKinnon had earlier served as a minister in the governments of Sir Charles Court and Ray O'Connor. He worked as an accountant before entering politics, and since leaving parliament has involved himself in various community organisations.

Early life
MacKinnon was born in Perth to Beryl (née Mounsey) and Keith MacKinnon, his father being a builder. His uncle, Graham MacKinnon, was a government minister and long-serving Liberal member of the WA Legislative Council, and the two served together in parliament from 1977 to 1986. MacKinnon was raised in Bridgetown (a small town in the South West), and attended Bridgetown High School before going to Perth to board at Wesley College. He later went on to the University of Western Australia, where he graduated with a Bachelor of Economics and a diploma in accounting. Before entering politics, MacKinnon worked as an accountant. He began as a clerk with Bushells (a tea company), and subsequently spent several years with a Perth-based firm before starting his own business.

Political career
MacKinnon was elected to the seat of Murdoch in 1977. He switched to the seat of Jandakot in 1989 when Murdoch was abolished. He represented Jandakot until he retired at the 1993 state election.

MacKinnon became Leader of the Opposition in February 1986, replacing Bill Hassell. He served as a shadow to three Labor premiers - Brian Burke, Peter Dowding and Carmen Lawrence - over six years. His replacement, Richard Court, became Premier after only nine months as Opposition Leader.
Court ousted MacKinnon in a leadership coup by a vote of 20 to 12.

MacKinnon's leadership came to an end on 12 May 1992 just a day after that of his South Australian Liberal counterpart Dale Baker.

Honours
In 1997 MacKinnon was made a Member of the Order of Australia for services to people with hearing impairments. He also received a Centenary Medal in 2001.

References

1944 births
Living people
Australian accountants
Liberal Party of Australia members of the Parliament of Western Australia
Members of the Order of Australia
Members of the Western Australian Legislative Assembly
People educated at Wesley College, Perth
Politicians from Perth, Western Australia
University of Western Australia alumni